Serhiy Saveliyovych Onopko (born 26 October 1973) is a Ukrainian retired professional footballer  who played as a midfielder.

Club career
During his career Onopko played for Shakhtar Donetsk, Mykolaiv, Vorskla Poltava, Inter Baku, Dnipro Cherkasy and Hirnyk Kryvyi Rih.

Personal life
He is a younger brother of Viktor Onopko.

Honours
Shakhtar Donetsk
 Ukrainian Premier League runner-up: 1993–94, 1996–97, 1997–98
 Ukrainian Cup: 1994–95, 1996–97

External links

Serhiy Onopko: Nobody was inviting my brother to the Ukrainian national team, yet to the Russian they called right away. UA-Football. 27 December 2007
 
 

1973 births
Living people
Footballers from Luhansk
Soviet footballers
Ukrainian footballers
Ukraine under-21 international footballers
FC Shakhtar Donetsk players
FC Shakhtar-2 Donetsk players
Soviet Top League players
Ukrainian Premier League players
Ukrainian First League players
Ukrainian Second League players
MFC Mykolaiv players
FC Vorskla Poltava players
FC Vorskla-2 Poltava players
Shamakhi FK players
Ukrainian expatriate footballers
Expatriate footballers in Azerbaijan
Ukrainian expatriate sportspeople in Azerbaijan
FC Dnipro Cherkasy players
FC Hirnyk Kryvyi Rih players
Association football midfielders